Olga Korsak (born February 10, 1989 in Riga, Latvia) is a former competitive figure skater for Latvia, and is now an actress and singer/songwriter living in Toronto, Ontario, Canada. She is the 2006-2007 Latvian National Champion, as well as earning silver in 2004-2005, and bronze in 2002-2003.

In 2006, Olga suffered a back injury while trying to qualify at the World Figure Championships in Calgary, Alberta, Canada. Her injury forced her to retire from figure skating.

After graduating from the Latvian Academy of Sports Education, with a Bachelor of Arts Degree in Dance Stage Production & Fitness, she moved to Toronto, Canada in October 2009 to pursue her dream of becoming an actress and singer/songwriter. 

As her music stage name of LIVVA, she achieved recognition in 2014 with her self-released debut album, Behind Closed Doors, which sold more than 10,000 copies in Canada.

After a few independent multilingual films, she was cast in 2018 as the lead in Junga Song's movie The Petrichor alongside famous Russian star Aleksei Serebryakov (which also featured the 2015 Junior, 2016 and 2017 Senior World Champion and 2018 Olympic double silver medalist Evgenia Medvedeva in a cameo). The film follows the story of Maya, a former figure skater who, due to personal tragedy, fails her first two attempts at senior international competition. Inspired by her skating idol, Igor Rusky, she decides at the age of thirty to get back on the ice and pursue her dream of competing once more. 

The Petrichor premiered at the Moscow International Film Festival on October 2, 2020. The film won Best Feature Film and Olga won Best Actress at the Canadian Cinematography Awards and many more awards are followed in 2020.

Awards

|-
! scope="row" | 2020
| The Petrichor
| Oniros film awards - Best Actress
| 

|-
! scope="row" | 2020
| The Petrichor
| Canadian Cinematography Awards - Best Actress
| 

|-
! scope="row" | 2020
| The Petrichor
| American Golden Picture International Film Festival - Best Actress
| 

|-
! scope="row" | 2020
| The Petrichor
| Gold Movie Awards - Best Actress
| 

|-
! scope="row" | 2020
| The Petrichor
| Best Actor Award - Silver award
| 

|-
! scope="row" | 2020
| The Petrichor
| American Golden Picture International Film Festival - Best Actress
| 

|-
! scope="row" | 2020
| The Petrichor
| Venice Film Awards - Best Soundtrack (Not Afraid to Fall - LIVVA)
| 

|-
! scope="row" | 2020
| The Petrichor
| Tracks Music Awards - Best Original Song (Not Afraid to Fall - LIVVA)
| 

|-
! scope="row" | 2020
| The Petrichor
| Oniros Film Awards - Best Sound track (Not Afraid to Fall - LIVVA)
| 

|-
! scope="row" | 2020
| The Petrichor
| American Golden Picture International Film Festival - Best Composer (Not Afraid to Fall - LIVVA)
|

References

External links
 
 
 

Latvian female single skaters
1988 births
Living people
Sportspeople from Riga